A big cheese is a boss or other senior person, particularly in an organization.

Big Cheese or The Big Cheese may also refer to:

Arts and Entertainment

Music 
 Big Cheese (band), an English straight edge hardcore punk band
 "Big Cheese", a song by American rock band Bayside from their 2014 album, Cult
 “Big Cheese”, a song by American rock band Nirvana from their 1989 album, Bleach

Television 
 "The Big Cheese", an episode of animated series Camp Lazlo
 "The Big Cheese", an episode of animated series Dexter's Laboratory
 "The Big Cheese" (Foster's Home for Imaginary Friends), a 2006 episode of animated series Foster's Home for Imaginary Friends
 "The Big Cheese", an episode of animated series Maggie and the Ferocious Beast

Other 
 Big Cheese (magazine), an independent music magazine published in the United Kingdom
 Bodalla Big Cheese, a visitor attraction in Bodalla, New South Wales
 Big Cheese, the prime minister of Little Tokyo in the anime Samurai Pizza Cats

See also
 Cheese (disambiguation)